Stanisław Czulak (7 January 1900 – 2 November 1974) was a Polish footballer. He played in one match for the Poland national football team in 1924.

References

External links
 

1900 births
1974 deaths
Polish footballers
Poland international footballers
Footballers from Kraków
Association football midfielders
Wisła Kraków players